The title of Duchess of Braganza has existed in Portugal since the 15th century. This title designates the female head of the House of Braganza.

Duchess of Braganza

House of Braganza

Nominal Duchess of Braganza

House of Braganza

See also 
Princess of Portugal
Princess of Brazil
Princess Royal of Portugal
List of Portuguese consorts
List of Brazilian consorts

References

 
Braganza
Lists of Portuguese people